Senožeti is a settlement on the left bank of the Sava River in the Municipality of Dol pri Ljubljani in the southeastern part of the Upper Carniola region of Slovenia.

References

External links

Senožeti on Geopedia

Populated places in the Municipality of Dol pri Ljubljani